Tetraacetylethane is the organic compound with the nominal formula [CH(C(O)CH3)2]2. It is a white solid that has attracted interest as a precursor to heterocycles and metal complexes. It is prepared by oxidation of sodium acetylacetonate:

I2 + 2 NaCH(C(O)CH3)2 → [CH(C(O)CH3)2]2 + 2 NaI

Reminiscent of the case of acetylacetone, tetraacetylethane exists as the enol, as established by X-ray crystallography. The two C3O2H rings are twisted with a dihedral angle near 90°.

Many metal complexes have been prepared from the conjugate base of this ligand. One example is diruthenium(III) derivative [Ru(acac)2]2[C(C(O)CH3)2]2, which is closely related to ruthenium(III) acetylacetonate.

References

Diketones
Chelating agents
Ligands
3-Hydroxypropenals